Brewmeister may refer to

 Brewmaster or head brewer
 Brewmeister (brewery), the Scottish brewery